The Speer Family was a Southern gospel family musical group. It was founded in 1921 by George Thomas ("Dad") Speer (1891–1966), his wife, Lena Darling ("Mom") Speer (née Brock; 1899–1967), and his sister and brother-in-law, Pearl Claborn (1902–1979) and Logan Claborn (William Logan Claborn; 1896–1981). Harold Lane was also member of this group

Early years

Both George Thomas and Lena came from musical families. G.T. and Lena began the group to supplement their income, which otherwise came from farming. Before them, almost all gospel groups were made up solely of men. The Speer Family are considered pioneers in featuring women singers.

Within two years, the group had become so successful that G.T. Speer decided to make the group full-time. In the late 1920s, the group established a working relationship with the James David Vaughan Music Company, selling songbooks. However, the group's success proved to be insufficient to support two families' budgets. In 1925, Logan and Pearl Claborn left the group; Logan returned to his job as a carpenter. To fill the void, "Dad" Speer enlisted 5-year-old Brock Speer and 3-year-old Rosa Nell Speer to sing with him and his wife. The group's concerts featured several duet songs by "Dad" and "Mom" Speer, and several songs with Brock singing alto and Rosa Nell singing lead.

In 1934, "Dad" Speer accepted a full-time job with the Vaughan Music Company. This position afforded greater financial security for the family. Also in the 1930s, two more siblings, Mary Tom Speer (1925-2014) and Ben Speer (1930-2017), joined the group.

In 1941, James Vaughan died, and the Speer family left his company. During his time at the Vaughan Company, "Dad" Speer wrote or co-wrote more than 600 songs. After leaving, they joined the Stamps-Baxter company, a Vaughan competitor, and also became a regular performer on the WSFA radio station.

Later years/deaths
George Thomas "Dad" Speer died in 1966 and Lena "Mom" Speer died in 1967. Pearl and Logan Claborn died in 1979 and 1981 respectively. The group, led by brothers Brock (died March 29, 1999 at age 78) and Ben, underwent various configurations over the next several decades. Ben retired from the group in 1993 although he did appear on occasion with the group until Brock officially retired the Speer Family at the 1998 National Quartet Convention. Ben Speer continued to be involved in Southern Gospel music as the Music Director of the Gaither Homecoming Series, and as owner of Ben Speer's Stamps-Baxter School of Music, a Southern Gospel singing school, up until his death in 2017.

Ben, Mary Tom, and Rosa Nell continued to make appearances in Gaither Homecoming videos. The group was inducted into the Gospel Music Association's Hall of Fame in 1998, following individual inductions for "Dad" Speer (1971); "Mom" Speer (1972); Brock Speer (1975); and Ben Speer (1995).

The Speer Family was the first group to receive the Gospel Music Association's Lifetime Achievement Award. Other recognition for the Speers included inclusion in the Alabama Music Hall of Fame, receiving the Southern Gospel Music Guild's Heritage Award, and receiving 14 Dove Awards. The group's recording of "I'm Standing on the Solid Rock" has the distinction of having the longest tenure as the top song on the Singing News chart of popular Southern Gospel recordings.

Mary Tom Speer-Reid died on September 16, 2014, aged 89. Ben Speer died on April 7, 2017 at age 86. A month later, Rosa Nell Speer-Powell, who was the last survivor of the original Speer Family, died on May 16, 2017 at the age of 94.

Discography (incomplete)
 1949: Especially Warm (Heart Warming)
 1951: Happy Harmonies (Vista)
 1953: The Speer Family Sings Songs You Requested (Skylite)
 1955: The Speer Family Album (RCA Victor)
 1958: "Dad" Speer's Golden Anniversary In Gospel Music (Sing LP 701)
 1959: Because Of Him (Skylite)
 1960: The Singing Speers (Skylite)
 1961: All-Night Singing: Speer Family Style (Starday)
 1961: Family Favorites (Skylite)
 1963: The Speer Family Sacred Hour (RCA Camden)
 1964: Garden Of Melody (Skylite)
 1964: Old-Time Family Religion (Speer Family, Johnson Family, Carter Family) (RCA Camden)
 1965: A Singing Heritage (Heart Warming)
 1965: On Concert Tour! (Heart Warming)
 1965: The Happy Jubilee (Heart Warming)
 1965: Won't We Be Happy (Skylite)
 1966: Rejoicing With Mom (Heart Warming)
 1966: The Gospel In Song (RCA Victor)
 1967: "Dad" Speer's Greatest Hits (Skylite)
 1967: Hymns Of Joy And Peace (Heart Warming)
 1968: Big Singing Day (Heart Warming)
 1969: Heavy On Ben (Heart Warming)
 1970: The Old Rugged Cross Made The Difference (Heart Warming)
 1971: The King Is Coming (Heart Warming)
 1972: A Family Affair (Heart Warming)
 1972: The Speers In Concert (Heart Warming)
 1973: Friendship with Jesus (Vista)
 1973: Happy Harmonies (Vista)
 1973: He Touched Me (Vista)
 1973: Touring That City (Heart Warming)
 1974: A Tribute - The Songs Of Bill and Gloria Gaither (Heart Warming)
 1974: God Gave The Song (Heart Warming)
 1975: Doug Oldham and the Speers (Heart Warming)
 1975: Especially Warm (Heart Warming)
 1975: Something Good Is About To Happen (Heart Warming)
 1975: The Best of the Best (A/The Speers, B/The Imperials) (Heart Warming)
 1975: The King Is Coming" (Heart Warming)
 1976: Between The Cross and Heaven (Heart Warming)
 1977: Cornerstone (Heart Warming)
 1978: Promises to Keep (Heart Warming)
 1978: The Songs Live on (Heart Warming)
 1980: Interceding (Heart Warming)
 1981: 60th Anniversary Celebration (Heart Warming)
 1981: Celebrating 60th Anniversary Featuring Mom & Dad (Skylite)
 1982: Hallelujah (Heart Warming)
 1982: Tribute (Heart Warming)
 1983: Keep a Happy Heart (Skylite)
 1983: The Speers Live (Featuring The Speer Sisters) (Heart Warming)
 1984: Sunday Morning Singing (RiverSong)
 1985: Family Reunion (RiverSong)
 1985: Rejoicing (Riversong)
 1985: The Speer Family (GreatComm)
 1986: Stepping Out in Faith (RiverSong)
 1987: Celebration At Sea (Live) (Riversong)
 1988: Saved To The Uttermost (Homeland)
 1989: He's Still In The Fire (Homeland)
 1990: Best of the Best...Songs You Keep Asking For (Homeland)
 1990: Hallelujah Time (Homeland)
 1991: The Speers 70th Anniversary Celebration (Homeland)
 1992: He Still Reigns'' (Homeland)

References

American Christian musical groups
Musical groups established in 1921
Family musical groups
Musical groups from Nashville, Tennessee
Southern gospel performers
RCA Victor artists